The Progressive Youth Federation of India (PYFI) is the youth wing of the Revolutionary Communist Party of India (RCPI). It was established in 1986. The organisation is active in West Bengal and Assam. It follows the principles of scientific socialism.

The slogan of PYFI is "Struggle, Peace and Progress".

Flag
The length and breadth of the flag is 3:2, the colour of the flag is blue. There is a red star (★) in the top right corner of the flag, whichsymbolises "struggle", and on the right of the flag, "PYFI" is written vertically in white.

State secretaries
1. Assam: Hamdur Rahman (i/c)
2. West Bengal: Sanjay Basu

State presidents
1. Assam: Uttam Chetia (i/c)
2. West Bengal: Abhijit Chakraborty

References

Revolutionary Communist Party of India
Organizations established in 1986
Youth organisations based in India
1986 establishments in India